The men's javelin at the 2016 IPC Athletics European Championships was held at the Stadio Olimpico Carlo Zecchini in Grosseto from 11-16 June.

Medalists

See also
List of IPC world records in athletics

References

Javelin
Javelin throw at the World Para Athletics European Championships